is a passenger railway station located in the city of Fukuchiyama, Kyoto Prefecture, Japan, operated by West Japan Railway Company (JR West).

Lines

Station layout
The station consists of one ground-level island platform connected to the station building by a footbridge. The station is unattended.

Platforms

Adjacent stations

History
Isa Station opened on November 3, 1904. With the privatization of the Japan National Railways (JNR) on April 1, 1987, the station came under the aegis of the West Japan Railway Company.

Passenger statistics
In fiscal 2016, the station was used by an average of 491 passengers daily

Surrounding area
 Osadano Industrial Park
Kyoto Prefectural High School
 Fukuchiyama City Senkyo Elementary School

See also
List of railway stations in Japan

References

External links

 Station Official Site

Railway stations in Kyoto Prefecture
Sanin Main Line
Railway stations in Japan opened in 1904
Fukuchiyama, Kyoto